Justinopolis may refer to several cities named after Justin I or Justin II:

Justinopolis in Cilicia, a former name of Anavarza, Turkey
Justinopolis in Istria, a former name of Koper, Slovenia
Justinopolis in Osrhoene, a former name of Urfa, Turkey